Mohammed Ibrahim Eid (Arabic:محمد إبراهيم عيد) (born 7 August 1991) is an Emirati footballer. He currently plays for Al-Hamriyah.

References

External links
 

Emirati footballers
1991 births
Living people
Dubai CSC players
Al Shabab Al Arabi Club Dubai players
Sharjah FC players
Ajman Club players
Dibba FC players
Al Hamriyah Club players
UAE First Division League players
UAE Pro League players
Association football forwards